Woodlandville is an unincorporated rural hamlet in western Boone County, Missouri, United States. The community is on Missouri Route J about six miles south of Harrisburg and 5.5 miles north of I-70 and Rocheport. There is only a church there, and a large water tower, along with a few homes.

History
A post office called Woodlandville was established in 1872, and remained in operation until 1932. Woodlandville was so named because the land was covered with wood, and in contradistinction to prairie.

References

Unincorporated communities in Boone County, Missouri
Unincorporated communities in Missouri